Spot blotch may refer to:
 Spot blotch (barley), a disease of barley caused by Cochliobolus sativus
 Spot blotch (wheat), a leaf disease of wheat caused by Cochliobolus sativus